The Republic of Cospaia (local dialect: Republica de' Cošpäja) was a small state within modern-day Italy, located in northern Umbria, independent from 1440 to 1826. It was located in what is now the hamlet (frazione) of Cospaia in the comune of San Giustino in the Province of Perugia.

History
It unexpectedly gained independence in 1440 after Pope Eugene IV, embroiled in a struggle with the Council of Basel, made a sale of territory to the Republic of Florence. By error, a small strip of land went unmentioned in the sale treaty and its inhabitants declared themselves independent.

The misunderstanding arose from the fact that, about 500 meters from the stream that was to establish the demarcation (simply called "Rio"), there was another stream with the same name. The delegates of the Florentine republic considered the "Rio" which was located further north as the new delimitation, whereas the delegates of the Papal States considered it the one further south. Thus a sort of terra nullius was formed whose inhabitants declared themselves independent, no longer subject to any authority. In 1484 its autonomy was formally recognized by both Florence and the Papal States, considering it not worth the trouble to redraw treaties in regard to an already complicated border.

On May 25, 1826, Cospaia was divided between Tuscany and the Papal States. The treaty was signed by the fourteen remaining family heads of Cospaia, in exchange for a silver coin, and being allowed to grow up to half a million tobacco plants a year.

Birth of the republic
The republican form of government was relatively uncommon until the French Revolution. There were maritime republics (with aristocratic institutions), the Republic of San Marino and alleged Republic of Senarica (in Abruzzo), with an elected doge akin to the system used in Venice, but its real existence has not been historically proven with proper documentation.

The inhabitants of Cospaia, therefore, preferred to base their independence on the total freedom of the inhabitants, all holders of sovereignty, not entrusted to any organ of power, unlike in states. Cospaia also had an official flag, which is still used on some occasions. The banner was characterized by a black and a white field, divided diagonally. In the coat of arms there appeared "the village between the two small streams, with two fish on the right and the plant of Nicotiana tabacum on the left, above was the motto and years of the republic".

The inhabitants of Cospaia did not, therefore, have tribute obligations with either the Papal States nor the Grand Duchy of Tuscany, and the goods that passed through the territory were not subject to any tariffs; it was therefore a free economic zone and buffer state between the two powers. Although Cospaia extended over just 330 hectares (2 kilometers long and about 500 meters wide), the 250 inhabitants treasured the situation and took advantage of it to increase the cultivation of tobacco, among the first in the Italian peninsula. Even now, some varieties of tobacco are defined with the name of cospaia.

Cospaia was an early centre of tobacco production within Italy, using 25 hectares of fertile soil to grow it. One of the reasons for the prosperity of Cospaia was that it was the only place in Italy that did not follow with the papal ban on tobacco growing, thus ensuring a monopoly on production.

Form of government

The Republic of Cospaia did not have a formal government or official legal system. There were no jails or prisons and there was no standing army or police force. At the head of the administration, there was the Council of Elders and Family Heads, which was summoned for decision making and judicial duties. The curate of San Lorenzo also took part in the meetings of the "Council of Elders", as "president", a position shared with a member of the Valenti family, the most important in the country. Council meetings were held in the Valenti house until 1718, when the council began to meet in the Church of the Annunciation, where they would stay until the republic's dissolution. On the architrave of the church door one can still read the only written law of the tiny republic: 
 ("Perpetual and secure freedom"). This Latin phrase was also engraved on the parish bell. Although the republic had no tariffs, it is not clear that it had no taxes as it may have had an unofficial tax in the form of a council fee, though this is still being debated. If it existed, families that failed to pay up would have been excommunicated and forced to flee the republic into a "wide escape zone for exiles around Cospaia".

After several centuries of existence, Cospaia was reduced to a mere receptacle of contraband. The concept of freedom was somewhat tarnished in favor of its privileges, which attracted people of all kinds, for economic reasons or to escape the justice of the two large adjacent states. This situation was not unusual in the small states, especially in the "border" ones.

End of the republic
After the end of the Napoleonic Era, on 26 June 1826, with an act of submission by fourteen representatives of the republic, Cospaia became part of the Papal States: every inhabitant of Cospaia, as "compensation", obtained a papal silver coin and the authorization to continue tobacco cultivation, which was taken over by rich local landowners such as the Collacchioni and the Giovagnoli, who bought most of the territory contained within the borders of the former republic. They then extended tobacco production to the whole valley, imposing it as the principal agricultural commodity.

See also
Republic of Senarica
List of historic states of Italy
European microstates
List of republics

References

External links
 Ex Repubblica di Cospaia
 The Republic of Cospaia: An Anarchist Renaissance City by Ellie McFarland
 Cospaia (in Thayer's Gazetteer of Umbria)

States and territories established in 1440
States and territories disestablished in 1826
Italian city-states
Former republics
History of Tuscany
History of Umbria